The Albert Einstein World Award for Science is an annual award given by the World Cultural Council "as a means of recognition and encouragement for scientific and technological research and development", with special consideration for researches which "have brought true benefit and well being to mankind". Named for physicist and theoretician Albert Einstein (1879–1955); the award includes a diploma, a commemorative medal, and US$10,000.

The recipient of the award is evaluated and elected by an Interdisciplinary Committee, which is composed of world-renowned scientists, among them 25 Nobel laureates.

Award recipients

See also 
 Leonardo da Vinci World Award of Arts
 José Vasconcelos World Award of Education
 Albert Einstein Medal
 Albert Einstein Award
 Prizes named after people
 List of things named after Albert Einstein
 List of physics awards
 List of general science and technology awards

References

External links 
 

Science and technology awards
Physics awards
Albert Einstein
Awards established in 1984